Andrew Kemper "Skeeter" Shelton (June 29, 1888 – January 9, 1954) was a Major League Baseball outfielder. He was born and died in Huntington, West Virginia.

Shelton played for the New York Yankees in the  season, appearing in 10 consecutive games over an eight-day period from August 25 to September 1. In his ten career games, he had one hit in 40 at-bats for a .025 batting average. At center field, he was perfect, handling 22 total chances (20 putouts, 2 assists).

He batted and threw right-handed. Shelton was the baseball coach at West Virginia University from 1918 to 1920 and at Marshall University from 1922 to 1923.

Head coaching record

Football

References

External links
 
 

1888 births
1954 suicides
Major League Baseball outfielders
Minor league baseball managers
New York Yankees players
Marshall Thundering Herd athletic directors
Marshall Thundering Herd baseball coaches
Marshall Thundering Herd football coaches
Marshall Thundering Herd men's basketball coaches
Charleston Golden Eagles football coaches
West Virginia Mountaineers football players
West Virginia Mountaineers football coaches
West Virginia Mountaineers baseball players
West Virginia Mountaineers baseball coaches
Columbus Senators players
Maysville Rivermen players
Huntington Blue Sox players
Youngstown Steelmen players
Sportspeople from Huntington, West Virginia
Baseball players from West Virginia
Basketball coaches from West Virginia
Suicides by firearm in West Virginia
Suicides in West Virginia
Burials at Spring Hill Cemetery (Huntington, West Virginia)